Mehak Kesar (born 15 December 1992) is an Indian cricketer who plays for Punjab Women's Cricket Team. She is a right-arm off break bowler and a right-handed lower order batter. In 2019, she was the Vice Captain of Punjab Women's Cricket Team when they won their maiden T20 title of 2018–19 Senior Women's T20 League. In 2021, she was selected to represent India-A ahead of 2021–22 Senior Women's Challenger Trophy organized by Board of Control for Cricket in India.

Early life 
Kesar was born on 15 December 1992 in Sonipat, Haryana. She represented Haryana at junior and sub-junior levels in table tennis, baseball and softball.

At the age of 17, she moved to Jalandhar, Punjab and started her initial coaching in cricket and slowly became passionate about the sport.

Career 
Kesar started playing for Punjab Women's in 2010. She was also part of the North Zone Team from 2015-2018 and member of GND University Team from 2011-2015. She led the Under 23 Punjab's Women Cricket Team in the year 2015-2016.

She was named best bowler of the tournament in BCCI Senior Women Elite Group 2016-2017 and Rama Atray Memorial Tournament in 2016-2017.

She played for India A in 2021–22 Senior Women's Challenger Trophy in which India A emerged as the champions.

References

External links 
Mehak Kesar at ESPNcricinfo

Mehak Kesar at CricketArchive (subscription required)

1992 births
Living people